Bellair may refer to:

 Bellair, Missouri
 Bellair, Clay County, Florida
 Bellair (New Bern, North Carolina), listed on the NRHP in North Carolina
 Bellair (Charlottesville, Virginia), listed on the NRHP in Virginia
 Bellair, County Antrim, a townland in County Antrim, Northern Ireland
 Bellair (surname)

See also
Belair (disambiguation)
Bel Air (disambiguation)
Bel-Aire (disambiguation)
Belleair (disambiguation)
Bellaire (disambiguation)
Bellairs (surname)